Sir Walter Roberts  (14 December 1893 – 18 November 1978) was a British diplomat. He was the only son of Judge Roberts, a Judge of the Clerkenwell County Court.

Career

Walter St Clair Howland Roberts was educated at Winchester College and Brasenose College, Oxford. He was admitted to the Middle Temple on 4 April 1914, withdrawing without being Called to the Bar on 13 January 1927. During the First World War he was a prisoner of war 1914–16, then served with the Royal Field Artillery 1917–19. He was awarded the Military Cross in 1918; the citation read: For conspicuous gallantry and devotion to duty. When his battery was under heavy shell fire, his utter contempt for danger was an inspiring example to all ranks, and it was largely due to his coolness that all guns were saved.

Roberts entered the Foreign Office in 1919. He was head of the Western Europe Department 1936–39 and of the Prisoner of War Department 1941–45. He was British Ambassador to Peru 1945–48; Minister to Romania 1949–51; and finally Minister to the Holy See 1951–53.

Walter Roberts was appointed CMG in 1937 and knighted KCMG in 1951. He was made an Officer of the Order of St John in 1974.

References
 ROBERTS, Sir Walter St Clair Howland, Who Was Who, A & C Black, 1920–2008; online edn, Oxford University Press, Dec 2007, accessed 19 March 2012
 Sir Walter Roberts, photo in "UK in Holy See's photostream" on flickr.com

1893 births
1978 deaths
People educated at Winchester College
Alumni of Brasenose College, Oxford
Ambassadors of the United Kingdom to Peru
Ambassadors of the United Kingdom to the Holy See
Recipients of the Military Cross
Knights Commander of the Order of St Michael and St George
Officers of the Order of St John
British Army personnel of World War I
Royal Field Artillery officers
British World War I prisoners of war